Adriana LaGrange  (born 1961 or 1962) is a Canadian politician elected in the 2019 Alberta general election to represent the electoral district of Red Deer-North in the 30th Alberta Legislature. Originally from Ontario, LaGrange moved to Red Deer in 1981. LaGrange was elected on April 16, 2019, and was appointed as the Minister of Education on April 30, 2019. In the 2019 Alberta general election, LaGrange won her constituency with a total of 12,739 votes based on a 62.6% voter turnout in Red Deer-North.

Career 
LaGrange received a diploma in Rehab Studies from Humber College, and worked with the mentally and physically disabled before entering the political arena. In her time in Red Deer, LaGrange has served as the president of the Alberta Catholic School Trustees' Association until her resignation in June 2018, vice-president of the Canadian Catholic School Trustees' Association, and has also served as a trustee on the Red Deer Catholic School board between 2007 and 2018. LaGrange is the former president of Red-Deer pro-life, and was on the board of directors for Alberta pro-life.

Political career 
LaGrange ran her campaign specifically on improving healthcare in the Red Deer area, re-configuring the education system, and lowering taxes to create jobs in Alberta. LaGrange used various mediums to communicate her platform to the public, including door-to-door canvassing, hiring volunteers, and using social media.

Minister of Education
Since her appointment to the Minister of Education, LaGrange has announced various legislation concerning Alberta's education system. On June 5, 2019, LaGrange introduced the new Education Act under the United Conservative Party. LaGrange was critiqued in the legislature by the leader of the official opposition, Rachel Notley, that the new Education Act does not protect LGBTQ+ students. LaGrange expressed that the Act will have the most advanced Gay–straight alliance provisions in all of Canada. Despite this claim, the Education Amendment Act removed provisions implemented by the previous NDP government designed to protect LGBTQ+ students. This included removing a prohibition on informing parents when a student joins a gay-straight alliance, and eliminating a requirement that students be permitted to use words such as "gay" or "queer" in naming their club. Tonya Callaghan, an associate professor at the University of Calgary, described this as "homophobic" and "heterosexist." The changes to the Education Act sparked rallies and a province-wide walkout from thousands of Alberta students, with advocates claiming that the changes will cause harm to LGBTQ+ students.

On August 22, 2019, LaGrange appointed a panel of education experts from a variety of school districts and post secondary institutions to review the province's curriculum. On October 23, 2019, Lagrange announced that the United Conservative Party revised the usage of seclusion rooms in public schools, limiting their usage to situations of a "last resort". On November 1, 2019, LaGrange announced that the United Conservative Party plans to build 15 new schools in Alberta along with 25 new education projects throughout the province such as modernization and updating infrastructure of schools currently operating.

On November 20, 2019, LaGrange announced an independent financial audit and governance review of the Calgary Board of Education after the Board announced the cutting of 300 temporary teaching jobs. LaGrange said the reason for the audit and governance review was to investigate the accountability of the Board's decision-making regarding its finances. After the announcement of layoffs, LaGrange said that the UCP was not aware of the actions. The Board had met with the United Conservative Party the day before the layoffs, but layoffs had not been mentioned.

On March 28, 2020, LaGrange temporarily cut the budgets of school boards in Alberta, directing them to lay off approximately 20,000 - 25,000 employees. LaGrange had previously promised to maintain funding during the pandemic. This was the biggest single layoff in Canadian history. The Alberta Government announced that education funding was restored to its previous levels on July 1, 2020.

In Canada, the disciplinary process for teachers varies by jurisdiction and the country currently has no central repository of serious abuses by teachers, "there could be people falling through the gaps," LaGrange told CBC News in an interview. With LaGrange as Minister of Education, Alberta passed the Students First Act on December 1, 2021, which established a database “detailing the professional standing of all Alberta-certified teachers and teacher leaders”  It required background checks every five years in addition to initially.  

On May 31, 2022, the Education (Reforming Teacher Profession Discipline) Act passed, which brought all teachers, principals and superintendents under one discipline process, and made an independent commission to investigate and oversee that process. Additionally, the bill introduced “new requirements for key individuals in the education system... to report to the police where there has been serious harm or a threat to student safety.” Previously the Alberta Teacher’s Association was "not under any obligation to report potential criminal behaviour on the part of teachers to police." The new code of conduct took affect January 1, 2023.

Curriculum review
In response to drafts of the curriculum published by the CBC in October 2020, critics said that the social science and fine arts curriculum was "disconnected from current research" and favoured "white, European perspectives".

A Calgary-based lawyer, William French, hired by the department, recommended resources from the Charlottesville, Virginia-based Core Knowledge Foundation's resources for the new fine arts and literature curriculum. This included a list of 80 songs which was largely copied from a 2001 Core Knowledge document to be taught in primary school—songs that most Albertans would know, but critics claimed were outdated or racist.

In December 2020, the department invited thirty academics including University of Alberta social studies professor, Carla Peck, to review a draft of the curriculum. Peck found that the curriculum was "hugely overloaded, with lists of information, with names and places." Education professor at the University of Alberta, Dwayne Donald, said that the "social studies curriculum is written like a "moral success story" of western civilization. By February, 19 advisors including several from outside Alberta reviewed drafts of a new provincial elementary school curriculum.

According to a Calgary Herald article, LaGrange says the new curriculum focuses on improving literacy and numeracy. It includes computer programming, financial literacy, diversity in Alberta, and the "idea of consent to prevent sexual exploitation".

The new curriculum is based on the hypothesis that "there is a common cache of knowledge every child should know, and which should be taught in chronological order," which is an approach that some curriculum experts have "panned as outdated and with no basis in modern research."

Feedback sessions were planned to run from April 2021 through February 2022, during which time LaGrange expects some classrooms will begin using the draft.  As of September the government intends to develop new resources with a budget of $6 million in 2021. The new curriculum is planned to be introduced in some classrooms in September 2021.

Concerns have been raised that the curriculum is rife with plagiarism and errors of fact, including lifting content from Wikipedia without appropriate attribution, which would indicate a lack of due diligence and a lack of consultation with subject-matter experts.

Non-Confidence Vote
On May 23, 2021, at the Alberta Teachers' Association Annual Representative Assembly, a motion of non-confidence in LaGrange was passed with 99% of delegates voting in favour.

References

United Conservative Party MLAs
Living people
Women MLAs in Alberta
21st-century Canadian politicians
1960s births
Members of the Executive Council of Alberta
People from Guelph
People from Red Deer, Alberta
Alberta school board trustees
Women government ministers of Canada
Education ministers of Alberta
21st-century Canadian women politicians